The Grand Island Carnegie Library is a historic building in Grand Island, Nebraska. It was built in 1903 as one of several Carnegie libraries in Nebraska, and it was the first public library in Grand Island. Its construction cost $19,000. The building was the first library It was designed in the Classical Revival architectural style. It has been listed on the National Register of Historic Places since May 2, 1975.

The library was one in a string of thousands that Carnegie funded across the country in an effort to restore Carnegie's image which was tarnished after the Johnstown Flood. Carnegie's pursuit to restore his name wasn't just confined to the building of libraries like that in Grand Island; he also funded the building of the Carnegie Hall In New York, NY.

Also See
Andrew Carnegie

Henry Clay Frick

Johnstown Flood

South Fork Fishing and Hunting Club

References

External links

National Register of Historic Places in Hall County, Nebraska
Neoclassical architecture in Nebraska
Library buildings completed in 1903
Carnegie libraries in Nebraska